Black Tower (Černá věž) is a well-known 16th century tower in České Budějovice, Czech Republic. It is situated near the NE corner of Přemysl Otakar II Square, next to the Cathedral of St. Nicholas, and is a favourite sight.

Notes

Towers completed in the 16th century
Renaissance architecture in the Czech Republic
Buildings and structures in České Budějovice
Tourist attractions in the South Bohemian Region
Towers in the Czech Republic